Judith Baker (died December 17, 2014, age 75) was an American female judoka. Baker was a four time national champion and a 4th degree blackbelt.  For many years the ceiling in rank for women in judo was 5th degree.

Martial arts career
In the second National USJA Women's Judo Championship, she competed in the brown belt technique division and was the division champion.  At the Ju-no-kata division she won first with Joan Millay.
In 1977 at the Women's Judo National's, she worked with Linda Stoops and took first in Ju No Kata and Nage-no-kata, and second in Katame-no-kata. She earned second place in those divisions in the US Women's International Judo invitational.

She was recognized as a Judo player, Kata Champion and Judo coach in the state of Ohio and the nation.

Personal life 
Baker graduated in 1962 from the University of Cincinnati. She died on December 17, 2014.

References

Further reading
 Staff (September 7, 1973). "All Tied Up in Knots; Men Shouldn't Make Passes at Girls in These Classes". The Milville Daily. p. 6
 Burroughs, Virginia (June 17, 1981). "Daytonian Is Late Sports Bloomer, in Judo". Dayton Daily News. p. 17

1930s births
2014 deaths
Judoka trainers
American female judoka
Year of birth missing
University of Cincinnati alumni
21st-century American women